Ohlungen is a commune in the Bas-Rhin department in Grand Est in north-eastern France.

History
Ohlungen was an Imperial Village (Reichsdorf) of the Holy Roman Empire. Within its jurisdiction was a former Imperial Hamlet  (Reichsweiler) called Keffendorf. Both passed to France in the Peace of Westphalia in 1648. In November 1944, German occupiers expelled around 10% of the village population in anticipation of severe fighting in the area.

See also
 Communes of the Bas-Rhin department

References

Communes of Bas-Rhin